Milford Sound / Piopiotahi is a fiord in the south west of New Zealand's South Island within Fiordland National Park, Piopiotahi (Milford Sound) Marine Reserve, and the Te Wahipounamu World Heritage site. It has been judged the world's top travel destination in an international survey (the 2008 Travelers' Choice Destinations Awards by TripAdvisor) and is acclaimed as New Zealand's most famous tourist destination. Rudyard Kipling had previously called it the eighth Wonder of the World. The fiord is most commonly accessed via road (State Highway 94) by tour coach, with the road terminating at a small village also called Milford Sound.

Etymology
Milford Sound / Piopiotahi is one of roughly 90 places to have been given a dual name as part of a 1998 Treaty of Waitangi settlement with Ngāi Tahu, recognising the significance of the fiord to both Māori and Pākehā New Zealanders. This name consists of both the Māori name and the former European name used together as a single name, instead of as interchangeable alternate names. 

In te reo Māori, the fiord is known as Piopiotahi after the now extinct piopio, a thrush-like bird that used to inhabit New Zealand. According to the Māori legend of Māui trying to win immortality for mankind, a single piopio flew to the fiord in mourning following Māui's death. The name Piopiotahi refers to this bird, with tahi meaning 'one' in Māori.
The fiord was given its European name in 1823, when the sealer John Grono named it Milford Sound after Milford Haven in his birthplace of Wales. The Cleddau River, which flows into the fiord, was also named for its Welsh namesake.

Geography
As a fiord, Milford Sound was formed by a process of glaciation over millions of years. The village at the end of the fiord is also known as Milford Sound.

Milford Sound runs 15 kilometres inland from the Tasman Sea at Dale Point (also named after a location close to Milford Haven in Wales)—the mouth of the fiord—and is surrounded by sheer rock faces that rise  or more on either side.

Milford Sound sports two permanent waterfalls, Lady Bowen Falls and Stirling Falls. After heavy rain temporary waterfalls can be seen running down the steep sided rock faces that line the fiord. They are fed by rainwater-drenched moss and will last a few days at most once the rain stops.

Climate
With a mean annual rainfall of  each year, a high level even for the West Coast, Milford Sound is known as the wettest inhabited place in New Zealand and one of the wettest in the world. Rainfall can reach  during 24 hours. The rainfall creates dozens of temporary waterfalls (as well as several major, more permanent ones) cascading down the cliff faces, some reaching a thousand metres in length. Smaller falls from such heights may never reach the bottom of the sound, drifting away in the wind.

Accumulated rainwater can, at times, cause portions of the rain forest to lose their grip on the sheer cliff faces, resulting in tree avalanches into the fiord. The regrowth of the rainforest after these avalanches can be seen in several locations along the sound.

Wildlife

Milford Sound is home to a variety of marine mammals, including seals and the southernmost wild population of bottlenose dolphins. Whales, especially the humpback and southern right whales, are increasingly observed due to the recoveries of each species. Penguins are also common within the sound, which is a breeding site for the Fiordland penguin and has subsequently been identified as an Important Bird Area by BirdLife International.

As a result of Milford Sound's high rainfall and the density of salt water, the surface of Milford Sound is a layer of freshwater containing tannins from the surrounding rainforest. This filters much of the sunlight which enters the water, allowing for a variety of Black coral to be found at depths of as shallow as 10 metres, significantly closer to the surface than usual.

History

Milford Sound was initially overlooked by European explorers because its narrow entry did not appear to lead into such large interior bays. Sailing ship captains such as James Cook, who bypassed Milford Sound on his journeys for just this reason, also feared venturing too close to the steep mountainsides, afraid that wind conditions would prevent escape.

The fiord was a playground for local Māori who had acquired a large amount of local marine knowledge including tidal patterns and fish feeding patterns over generations before European arrival.
The fiord remained undiscovered by Europeans until Captain John Grono discovered it c.1812 and named it Milford Haven after his homeland in Wales. Captain John Lort Stokes later renamed Milford Haven as Milford Sound. Following the passage of the Ngāi Tahu Claims Settlement Act 1998, the name of the fiord was officially altered to Milford Sound / Piopiotahi.

While Fiordland as such remained one of the least-explored areas of New Zealand up to the 20th century, Milford Sound's natural beauty soon attracted national and international renown, and led to the discovery of the McKinnon Pass in 1888, soon to become a part of the new Milford Track, an early walking tourism trail. In the same year, the low watershed saddle between the Hollyford River and the Cleddau River was discovered, where the Homer Tunnel was to be developed about sixty years later to provide road access.

As of the 2006 census, just 120 people lived in Milford Sound, most of them working in tourism or conservation.

Tourism

Overview
Milford Sound attracts between 550,000 and 1 million visitors per year. This makes the sound one of New Zealand's most-visited tourist spots even with its remote location and long journey times from the nearest population centres. Many tourists take one of the boat tours which usually last one to two hours. They are offered by several companies, departing from the Milford Sound Visitors' Centre.

Tramping, canoeing, and some other water sports are possible. A small number of companies also provide overnight boat trips. There is otherwise only limited accommodation at the sound, and only a very small percentage of tourists stay more than the day. Tourists usually stay in Te Anau or Queenstown.

The Milford Discovery Centre & Underwater Observatory is located in Harrisons Cove on the north side of the fiord.  Situated within the Piopiotahi Marine Reserve, the underwater observatory allows visitors to view the fiord's unique marine environment at a depth of 10 metres.  Due to a natural phenomenon called 'deep water emergence,' deep-water animals such as black coral can be viewed in the shallow waters surrounding the observatory. A dark surface layer of fresh water, stained brown by tannins from the surrounding forest, along with cold water temperatures allow the black corals to grow close to the surface throughout Milford Sound and Fiordland.

Milford Sound is also a destination for cruise ships.

Transport

There are also scenic flights by light aircraft and helicopter tours to and from Milford Sound Airport. The drive to Milford Sound itself passes through unspoiled mountain landscapes before entering the  Homer Tunnel which emerges into rain-forest-carpeted canyons that descend to the sound. The winding mountain road, while of high standards, is very prone to avalanches and closures during the winter half of the year.

The long distance to the sound means that tourist operators from Queenstown all depart very early in the day, arriving back only late in the evening. This ensures that most tourists visit Milford Sound within a few hours around midday, leading to some congestion on the roads and at the tourist facilities during the main season. The peak-time demand is also the reason for a large number of tour boats active in the sound at much the same time.

Over the years, various options for shortening the distance to Milford Sound from Queenstown have been mooted, including a gondola route, a new tunnel from Queenstown, or a monorail from near Lake Wakatipu to Te Anau Downs. All would reduce the current round-trip duration (which has to travel via Te Anau), thus allowing tourism to be spread out over more of the day. While a gondola is considered to be out of the running after the DOC declined approval for environmental reasons, the tunnel and the monorail proposals have applied to the Department of Conservation for concessions for land access.

There are a variety of plane charter companies that fly to Milford Sound. Most of the companies fly out of Queenstown International Airport. These companies include True South Flights, Glenorchy Air, Air Milford, and Milford Sound Scenic Flights.

Diesel spill

On 8 February 2004, a spill of 13,000 litres of diesel fuel was discovered, resulting in a 2-kilometre spill which closed the fiord for two days while intensive cleanup activities were completed. A hose was apparently used to displace the fuel from the tanks of one of the tour vessels, and various government officials claimed it appeared to be an act of ecoterrorism motivated by rising numbers of tourists to the park, though more details did not become known. The spill was removed and wildlife impact appears minimal.

See also
Doubtful Sound
Dusky Sound
Fiordland
Milford Sound Airport
Transport in Milford Sound

References

Further reading

External links

 Milford Sound—Destination Fiordland (regional tourism organisation)
 Map Chooser Land Information NZ Site – for downloading the Milford Sound / Piopiotahi topographic map

Fiords of New Zealand
Sounds of Fiordland
Important Bird Areas of New Zealand
Tourist attractions in Southland, New Zealand